The Arthur & Allan Morris Field (also known by its sponsored name Compass Grounds) is the home ground for the Redlands City Devils (QLDSL) and Redlands United. The ground is situated at the Cleveland showgrounds in the Redland shire. It has been voted one of the best fields in Queensland, Australia.

References 

Soccer venues in Queensland
Cleveland, Queensland
A-League Women stadiums
Buildings and structures in Redland City